Leticia Cáceres is an Argentinian-born Australian stage and film director. She is co-founder of RealTV theatre company, based in Melbourne.

Early life 
Cáceres was born in Córdoba, Argentina. Her parents, physicist Carlos Cáceres and computer programmer Maria Cáceres, fled Argentina  in 1981 during the Dirty war, seeking refuge in Canada. The family returned to Argentina in 1983 before leaving again in 1989. They initially moved back to Canada, before finally settling in Brisbane, Queensland, in 1991. Cáceres studied drama at Indooroopilly state school.

Education
In 2000, she graduated from the Queensland University of Technology with a bachelor's degree in drama.

She graduated with a Master's of Dramatic Art (Directing) from the Victorian College of the Arts, Melbourne University, in 2014.

Career 
Cáceres was associate director for Melbourne Theatre Company from 2013 to 2015, and Artistic Director of Tantrum Youth Arts between 2006 and 2007.

She was the associate director for Queensland Theatre between 2003 and 2005.

Cáceres's screen credits include Wild, which won Best First Time Director at the 2017 London Film Awards, and The True History of Billie The Kid, which was shown at the Melbourne International Film Festival in 2018.

She is one of the directors of the Australian TV series Bump.

In 2019, Cáceres became an artist-in-residence at Start VR.

RealTV

Cáceres is co-founder of an independent theatre company called RealTV (also spelt Real TV) with playwright Angela Betzien. Their work for young audiences include: Hoods, which won the multiple awards; War Crimes; and Children of the Black Skirt.

Awards 
In 2020, Cáceres won the award for Outstanding Direction in the Professional Theatre category at the Tasmanian Theatre Awards, for The Mares.

Cáceres' production of  Leah Purcell's The Drover's Wife (Belvoir St Theatre) won four Helpmann Awards including Best Direction and Best Production and four Sydney Theatre Awards including Best Direction and Best Production.

In 2017, she won the Gold Lion Award for Best First-Time Director at the London Film Awards, and the Next Gen Student Film Award at the Melbourne Women in Film Festival, for the short film, Wild.
She won the 2015 Best Director Green Room Award for her production of Simon Stephens' Birdland, presented by Melbourne Theatre Company.

In 2008, Cáceres won the award for Best Direction at the Matilda Awards, for Hoods. Hoods also won a Matilda Award for Best Independent Production,
the 2007 AWGIE Award for Theatre for Young Audiences and received a 2008 Helpmann nomination;

References

External links

Australian theatre directors
Living people
Helpmann Award winners
Year of birth missing (living people)